
Verney Lake (French: Lac du Verney) is a lake at Aosta Valley, Italy. At an elevation of 2088 m, its surface area is 0.203 km².

Lakes of Aosta Valley